Petričević is a Serbo-Croatian surname, a patronymic derived from Petrič, a diminutive of Petar. It may refer to:

Bogdan Petričević (born 1989), Montenegrin handball player
Luka Petričević (born 1992), Montenegrin footballer
Ivana Petričević (born 1974), Montenegrin politician
Anamarija Petričević (born 1972), retired Croatian swimmer
Suzana Petričević (born 1959), Serbian actress
Zvonko Petričević (1940-2009), Croatian basketball player

Serbian surnames
Montenegrin surnames
Croatian surnames